Junction City is a city in and the county seat of Geary County, Kansas, United States.  As of the 2020 census, the population of the city was 22,932.  Fort Riley, a major U.S. Army post, is nearby.

History

Junction City is so named from its position at the confluence of the Smoky Hill and Republican rivers, which forms the Kansas River.

In 1854, Andrew J. Mead of New York of the Cincinnati-Manhattan Company, Free Staters connected to the Massachusetts Emigrant Aid Company planned a community there called Manhattan (there was also a discussion to call it New Cincinnati).  When the steamship Hartford delivering the immigrants could not reach the community because of low water on the Kansas River, the Free Staters settled 20 miles east in what today is Manhattan, Kansas. The community was renamed Millard City for Captain Millard of the Hartford on October 3, 1855. It was renamed briefly Humboldt in 1857 by local farmers and renamed again later that year to Junction City.  It was formally incorporated in 1859.

In 1923, John R. Brinkley established radio station KFKB (which adopted the slogan ‘’Kansas First, Kansas Best’’) in nearby Milford, Kansas, using a 1 kW transmitter. It was one of the first radio stations in Kansas. Brinkley used the station to espouse his belief that goat testicles could be implanted in men to enhance their virility.

Among Junction City's residents is film director Kevin Wilmott, whose movies, including Ninth Street, are set in Junction City. Ninth Street specifically refers to a bawdy area of the community that was frequented by Fort Riley soldiers in the 1960s. In the 1980s a major initiative was undertaken to clean up the Ninth St. area.

Timothy McVeigh rented the Ryder truck he used in the Oklahoma City bombing from an auto body shop in Junction City.

Geography

Climate
The maximum temperature reaches  an average of 47 days per year and reaches  an average of 7 days per year. The minimum temperature falls below the freezing point (32 °F) an average of 126 days per year. Typically the first fall freeze occurs during the month of October, and the last spring freeze occurs during the month of April.

There are on average 86 days of measurable precipitation per year. Measurable snowfall occurs an average of 6 days per year with at least an inch of snow being received on four of those days. Snow depth of at least an inch occurs an average of 17 days per year.

Demographics

2010 census
As of the census of 2010, there were 23,353 people, 9,134 households, and 6,109 families living in the city. The racial makeup of the city was 60.7% White, 22.3% Black, 0.9% Native American, 3.9% Asian, 0.9% Pacific Islander, 4.0% from other races, and 7.3% from two or more races. Hispanic or Latino of any race were 13.0% of the population.

There were 9,134 households, of which 39.6% had children under the age of 18 living with them, 45.9% were married couples living together, 16.4% had a female householder with no husband present, 4.6% had a male householder with no wife present, and 33.1% were non-families. 27.6% of all households were made up of individuals, and 7% had someone living alone who was 65 years of age or older. The average household size was 2.53 and the average family size was 3.07.

The median age in the city was 28.8 years. 29% of residents were under the age of 18; 13% were between the ages of 18 and 24; 30.3% were from 25 to 44; 19.3% were from 45 to 64; and 8.4% were 65 years of age or older. The gender makeup of the city was 48.9% male and 51.1% female.

2000 census
As of the census of 2000, there were 18,886 people, 7,492 households, and 5,079 families living in the city. The racial makeup of the city was 58.38% White, 26.69% African American, 0.82% Native American, 3.83% Asian, 0.39% Pacific Islander, 4.01% from other races, and 5.88% from two or more races. Hispanic or Latino of any race were 8.31% of the population.

There were 7,492 households, out of which 35.7% had children under the age of 18 living with them, 49.8% were married couples living together, 14.6% had a female householder with no husband present, and 32.2% were non-families. 26.4% of all households were made up of individuals, and 9.1% had someone living alone who was 65 years of age or older. The average household size was 2.49 and the average family size was 3.00.

In the city, the population was spread out, with 28.2% under the age of 18, 13.4% from 18 to 24, 28.8% from 25 to 44, 18.5% from 45 to 64, and 11.1% who were 65 years of age or older. The median age was 30 years. For every 100 females, there were 93.2 males. For every 100 females age 18 and over, there were 88.5 males.

As of 2000 the median income for a household in the city was $30,084, and the median income for a family was $35,093. Males had a median income of $25,695 versus $20,846 for females. The per capita income for the city was $16,581. About 11.2% of families and 14.0% of the population were below the poverty line, including 20.4% of those under age 18 and 12.2% of those age 65 or over.

Government
Junction City has a Commission form of government.  The City Manager is responsible for the day-to-day operations of the City and serves at the discretion of the Commission.  The City Commission consists of five members who are elected by the registered voters of the City.  Each Commissioner serves for either two or four years, depending on the number of votes they received.  The mayor is a Commissioner that is "elected" by the other members of the Commission and serves for a minimum two-year term.

Education
The community is served by Geary County USD 475 public school district.  There is one public high school in the city, Junction City High School.

There were over 678 new students in the 2009–2010 school year, breaking all records for enrollment in the school district.

Media

The Junction City Daily Union is the local newspaper, published five days a week.

Three radio stations are licensed to and broadcast from Junction City. KJCK (AM) broadcasts on 1420 AM, playing a News/Talk format; its sister station, KJCK-FM, broadcasts on 97.5 FM, playing a Top 40 format. K222AX is a translator station that rebroadcasts the signal of KJIL, a Christian Contemporary station in Meade, Kansas, on 92.3 FM.

Junction City is in the Topeka, Kansas television market.

Transportation
 Greyhound Lines has a bus stop in Junction City.

Fiction
In Sidney Sheldon's New York Times bestseller Windmills of the Gods, the heroine of the novel is from Junction City.
In both the stage and film version of Hedwig and the Angry Inch, the character of Hedwig moves to Junction City after leaving East Germany.

The 13th mission of the video game Fallout Tactics: Brotherhood of Steel takes place in a location based on Junction City.

Notable people

Notable individuals who were born in and/or have lived in Junction City include U.S. Army Maj. Gen. Adna R. Chaffee, Jr., inventor Amanda Jones, playwright Velina Hasu Houston, and wrestler Bobby Lashley.

See also
 St. Xavier High School
 Operation Junction City
 Milford Lake
 Missouri–Kansas–Texas Railroad

References

Further reading

External links

 City of Junction City
 Junction City - Directory of Public Officials
 Junction City map, KDOT

Cities in Kansas
County seats in Kansas
Cities in Geary County, Kansas
Manhattan, Kansas metropolitan area